Vechelde is a municipality in the district of Peine, in Lower Saxony, Germany. It is situated approximately 12 km southeast of Peine, and 10 km west of Braunschweig.

Municipal subdivisions

Twinned cities 
Vechelde is twinned with:
  Valkeakoski, Finland since 1976
  Biederitz in Saxony-Anhalt, Germany since 1990
  Niemodlin, Poland since 2006

Main sights

References

External links

Official website (German)

Peine (district)
Duchy of Brunswick